Rage (Elvin Daryl Haliday, sometimes misspelled "Holliday", first name sometimes given as "Eldon") is a fictional character appearing in American comic books published by Marvel Comics. He has been a member of the Avengers and the New Warriors, and appeared in the pages of The Avengers, New Warriors, Night Thrasher, and Avengers: The Initiative.

Publication history

Rage was created by Larry Hama and Paul Ryan and first appeared in The Avengers vol. 1 #326 (November 1990).

Fictional character biography

Origin
Elvin Daryl Haliday was born in Brooklyn, New York. At age 13, he was exposed to toxic waste after hiding from bullies that attacked him for being in their neighborhood. Returning to his grandmother's home, Elvin was nursed back to health. The chemicals caused Elvin's teenage body to grow into adulthood in a matter of weeks, but also endowed him with superhuman strength, speed, and stamina. Encouraged by his grandmother to use his newfound abilities for good, Elvin adopted a costume and name: 'Rage.'

Avengers
Soon after his transformation, Rage confronted the Avengers, demanding to be made a member. He scolded Captain America for the team's lack of any black members. Rage left after a brief scuffle, but ended up assisting the Avengers in their next mission against L.D.50. Alongside the Avengers, he battled other-dimensional alien prisoners. After the team was reorganized under a new United Nations charter, Rage was invited to join as a probationary member.

In one of his first adventures as an Avenger, Rage battled Doctor Doom, and discovered that this Doom was actually a robot duplicate. During his Avengers career, he fought Ngh and the Tetrarchs of Entropy, the Brethren, the Collector, Brutus, and Grotesk. Rage was also shown, along with the Sandman, being trained by Captain America.

After racial tensions escalated due to the machinations of the energy vampire called the Hate-Monger, Rage and the New Warriors battled the Sons of the Serpent. The Avengers joined the fray, and Captain America was ultimately able to calm the situation and forced the Hate-Monger to retreat. During the battle, though, it came out that Rage was, in fact, only a teenager. Because of this, Cap told Rage that he could not be an Avenger, but could continue as a trainee if he wished.

New Warriors
Rage was dejected with the demotion. He soon helped the New Warriors and Darkhawk steal one of the Avengers' Quinjets for a mission to Cambodia to battle Tai and the Folding Circle. This Quinjet ended up being stolen by the Folding Circle, the very villains the New Warriors had gone off to fight. He was ultimately fired from the Avengers complete with a parting punch in the jaw from Hercules himself. About an hour later, he joined the New Warriors as a full member, and was given a new costume.

With Speedball, Rage battled an evil duplicate, and defeated it by absorbing it into himself. As a member of the New Warriors, he battled Force of Nature, the Trans-Saballian army, and, with Spider-Man, Archangel, and Doctor Strange, went up against Darkforce.

During his time with the New Warriors, Elvin's grandmother Edna Staples was killed right before his eyes by a street gang called the Poison Memories, bent on revenge against the team, leaving him an orphan. He donned a new costume after that, complete with a metal helmet. Andrew Chord, the legal guardian of his teammate Night Thrasher, became Elvin's legal guardian. For some time, Rage was in legal trouble with the authorities, as he had been accused of murdering Kimeiko Ashu, the leader of the Poison Memories. He was ultimately cleared of all charges with the assistance of Night Thrasher, who later took him to Paris for a memorial service for his grandmother.

Rage was part of the attacking force that traveled to a duplicate Earth on the far side of the moon during the Infinity Crusade. He teamed up with the X-Men member Cyclops and they were the closest to get to the villain's cathedral headquarters. Rage was swiftly dropped with a nerve pinch by Gamora and was out for the rest of the battle.

Later, Rage and Night Thrasher were voted out of the New Warriors after they had been absent during the team's battle with the paramilitary group Undertow who had enslaved their teammate Namorita. After their expulsion from the New Warriors, for a short time, Rage and Night Thrasher acted as mentors to their former foes, Psionex.

Later, Rage and Night Thrasher took it upon themselves to free Namorita from Undertow. After doing so, all three returned to the New Warriors. Eventually, though, the team began to drift apart and Night Thrasher formally disbanded them.

Reserve Avenger
After the New Warriors broke up, Elvin left for boarding school. Speedball contacted him to join a new version of the team, but Elvin turned him down, preferring to concentrate on his studies.

Elvin remained inactive as an adventurer and only returned a couple of times when called on as a reserve Avenger. First, he assisted the team against Morgan le Fay after the heroes returned from the Heroes Reborn universe. He later assisted them during the Avengers Disassembled situation.

Civil War
Rage and former teammate Justice learned that people were hunting down former New Warriors members because of the deaths caused by Nitro. They both sought the legal services of Jennifer Walters in protecting the allies of the New Warriors. They eventually discover that former New Warriors member Carlton Lafroyge (Hindsight Lad) was responsible for the persecution and exposure of their teammates. Hindsight had been operating a website outing the identities of the twenty or so remaining Warriors; he was also operating a dead pool. When John Jameson arrives, he arrests Hindsight. Rage remains on the scene until Jameson asks She-Hulk to marry him. Both Rage and Justice decided to side with Captain America during the Civil War, and refused to go along with the proposed Superhuman Registration Act. Rage is seen escaping from the containment van that held those that refused to comply with the Act.

The Initiative
Sometime later, Rage is seen on board a bus of new recruits arriving at Camp Hammond. During his time in the Initiative program, Rage is subjected to constant verbal abuse by Gauntlet about his former teammates, the New Warriors, due to the Stamford tragedy. Rage is among the recruits helping people get to safety during World War Hulk. After witnessing the battle between the Hulk and Iron Man, Rage orders the recruits to follow him and help battle the green gamma monster. However, they only see Hulk and his Warbound with the defeated Avengers lying at their feet. The recruits are defeated and imprisoned at Madison Square Garden and fitted with obedience disks to prevent their escape. They are subsequently rescued by the Shadow Initiative. The recruits (except for Komodo, who had obeyed orders not to engage the Hulk) are then subjected to even more verbal abuse and more intense training by Gauntlet as punishment for breaking ranks. Shortly thereafter, Gauntlet is found beaten nearly to death with a New Warriors "NW" scrawled across his chest in his own blood. All former New Warriors members and associates on base are detained for questioning. During the S.H.I.E.L.D. investigation, Rage reveals that he had an altercation with Gauntlet the day before the assault and that Gauntlet was about to recommend washing him out of the program and that his powers be removed until he turns 18.

During the Dark Reign storyline, Rage quits the Initiative along with other New Warriors-associated cadets (Justice, Debrii, Slapstick, and the remaining Scarlet Spiders) to form Counter Force. He later returned to Camp Hammond with the team, now calling themselves the New Warriors again, and battled Ragnarok, the clone of Thor.

Fear Itself
During the Fear Itself storyline, Rage appears at a meeting held by Prodigy regarding magical hammers that have crashed into the Earth. Rage and other heroes then battle Juggernaut, who was transformed into Kuurth: Breaker of Stone, in Las Vegas, Nevada. He is then seen with Debrii rescuing survivors and helps the team in their battle against Thor Girl, who had recovered her designate powers.

Secret Wars 2015
During the Secret Wars storyline, Demolition Man met Rage and Edwin Jarvis at Avengers Mansion during the incursion between Earth-616 and Earth-1610. The two enjoyed a brief career as Luchadore wrestlers.

Civil War II
During the Civil War II storyline, Rage comes to the aid of local neighborhoods in Brooklyn who are being attacked by the Americops, a private police force funded by Keane Industries. When confronting the Americops, Sam Wilson, the current Captain America, shows up to stop the fight and contain the situation, only to end up fighting the Americops himself. Rage jumps in to help Sam, but is later evacuated from the battle by the new Falcon. After Sam defeats U.S. Agent, Rage delivers a speech, where he complains that Sam cares more about his reputation than others and that people need him to stand up for them.

Captain America: Sam Wilson
Rage goes to Empire State University with the new Falcon, to confront an anti-immigrant politician who was giving a speech at campus. They later face the Bombshells, a trio of armored protesters, and defeat them. While returning home, Rage encounters Man Mountain Marko and Speed Demon, who were robbing a pawn shop. After a brief fight, the villains escape and Rage is arrested by the Americops. When Captain America offers him professional help, Rage turns it down, preferring to have him prove his innocence. Sam does that by releasing footage of the Americops beating him. Judge David Roderick deemed the footage inadmissible and had Rage convicted. In order to get better proof of Rage's innocence, Sam later caught Speed Demon where he confessed to his and Man Mountain Marko's robbery of the pawn shop. Rage is then beaten up in a penitentiary's Z Block by the super-powered prisoners which he previously apprehended. He was taken to the hospital. While visiting him, Sam is told by Claire Temple that Rage will not survive due to the extensive brain damage he sustained.

Venomized
Rage eventually recovered from his coma, against all odds, and when the Hive's invaded Earth, they sent agents to force symbiotes into bonding with superhumans, so a Poison could assimilate both the symbiote and its host. Together with D-Man, Rage oversaw the evacuation of Manhattan across the Manhattan Bridge. They were both attacked by a group of Poisons and bonded to symbiotes. Shortly afterwards, Rage and his symbiote were consumed by a Poison, resulting in their deaths. However, Rage and other surviving heroes who became Poisons in a few hours ago are quickly free from Poison's control and survive off-screen because the Poisons invasion is short-lived after a time-displaced Jean Grey destroyed the queen Poison. During Annihilation - Scourge, Rage is one of heroes called by Mister Fantastic in the Negative Zone to fight the forces of the Cancerverse led by that universe's Sentry.

Powers and abilities
Elvin's exposure to unknown biochemical radioactive wastes gave him superhuman strength, speed, stamina, durability and resistance to physical injury. He becomes exponentially stronger with applied force, such as hitting.  He is able to use his enhanced strength to leap great distances. In his first appearance, Rage was shown outrunning a speeding subway train, but this ability has not been used again.

Rage possesses basic street-fighting skills, and has received some combat training from Captain America and Night Thrasher.

Rage usually wears a costume of synthetic stretch fabric and body armor, and formerly wore a helmet of unspecified material, all of which he designed for himself.

Other versions

House of M
Rage appears as a member of the House of M's version of the Wolfpack alongside Speedball, Turbo, Zero-G, Darkhawk, and Lightspeed.

In other media

Television
 Rage makes a cameo in the Fantastic Four episode "To Battle the Living Planet".

Reception

Newsarama ranked Rage as the seventh worst Avengers member describing him as having been "created at a time when the formula for creating Avengers was Name > Costume > Concept > Usefulness > Relevance, and the formula for creating black superheroes was Teenager > Drugs > Skateboard > Urban > Character Development."

References

External links
 
 Rage at Marvel Wiki
 World of Black Heroes: Rage Biography

African-American superheroes
Avengers (comics) characters
Characters created by Larry Hama
Comics characters introduced in 1990
Fictional characters from New York (state)
Fictional characters with superhuman durability or invulnerability
Marvel Comics characters who can move at superhuman speeds
Marvel Comics characters with superhuman strength
Marvel Comics mutates
Marvel Comics superheroes